Víctor Sanchís García (born 23 March 2001) is a Spanish footballer who plays for CD Mirandés B. Mainly a right back, he can also play as a central defender.

Club career
Born in Barcelona, Catalonia, Sanchís represented RCD Espanyol and CF Damm as a youth. On 12 September 2020, after finishing his formation, he signed for Tercera División side Ourense CF.

Sanchís made his senior debut on 18 October 2020, starting in a 1–2 home loss against CD Ribadumia. He scored his first senior goal on 5 December, netting his team's second in a 3–1 home win over UD Ourense.

On 7 July 2021, Sanchís moved to CD Mirandés and was assigned to the reserves in the Tercera División RFEF. He made his first-team debut on 1 December, starting in a 3–0 away win over CD San Roque de Lepe in the season's Copa del Rey.

Sanchís made his professional debut on 16 December 2021, starting in a 2–1 win at CD Lugo, also in the national cup.

References

External links

2001 births
Living people
Footballers from Barcelona
Spanish footballers
Association football defenders
Tercera División players
Tercera Federación players
Ourense CF players
CD Mirandés B players
CD Mirandés footballers